Saint-Quentin-lès-Beaurepaire is a former commune in the Maine-et-Loire department in western France. On 1 January 2016, it was merged into the commune of Baugé-en-Anjou. Its population was 312 in 2019.

See also
Communes of the Maine-et-Loire department

References

Saintquentinlesbeaurepaire
Maine-et-Loire communes articles needing translation from French Wikipedia